was a Japanese automotive company with 58 manufacturing centres spread throughout the United States, European Union, South Korea, Mexico, Thailand, South Africa, India, China, and Malaysia.

The corporation was the result of a merger in 2000 between Calsonic Corp., which specialized in air conditioners and heat exchangers, and gauge maker Kansei Corp.. Nissan increased its shareholding in the company from 27.6 percent to 41.7 percent in January 2005. In November 2016, Nissan confirmed plans to sell its stake to U.S. private equity firm Kohlberg Kravis Roberts, who later obtained the rest of the company as well in February 2017.

In early 2019, Calsonic Kansei was merged with auto-parts maker Magneti Marelli, which was purchased for 6.2 billion euros from Fiat Chrysler Automobiles, by its parent and 100% owning fund, KKR.

History
On August 25, 1938, Calsonic Corp. was founded as Nihon Radiator Manufacturing Company, Ltd., with radiators as its product line. Nagao Gentaro was its first president. In 1952, the company was renamed more simply as Nihon Radiator Company. Nissan Motor would purchase 60% of the company's share in April 1954 for the purpose of securing the supply of radiators. That same year, Nihon Radiator began producing mufflers, and a year later it began producing car heaters.

The name "Calsonic" was first used in 1976 to refer to Nihon Radiator's first overseas manufacturing plant in California within the United States, combining the state's name with the word "sonic" from sonic speed to denote the company's dream of expansion. By 1988, Nihon Radiator changed its name to Calsonic Corporation in celebration of its 50th anniversary.

Kansei Corp. was established on October 25, 1956 as Kanto Seiki Company, Ltd., spinning off of Nissan Motor with instrument clusters as its main product. In 1960, the company headquarters and manufacturing plant would be relocated from Akabane, Kita, Tokyo Metropolis to Ōmiya City, Saitama Prefecture (now Saitama City.

On April 1, 2000, Calsonic and Kansei were merged to form Calsonic Kansei. Nissan increased its shareholding in the company from 27.6 percent to 41.7 percent in January 2005.

On November 22, 2016, American investment firm KKR & Co. announced that it will purchase Calsonic Kansei for $4.5 billion, succeeding over rival private investment firms Bain Capital and MBK Partners. KKR stated that its intention in buying Calsonic Kansei would be to help its international expansion while the company's local Japanese market is shrinking. By March 23, 2017, KKR officially completed the tender offer for Calsonic Kansei.

On October 22, 2018, Calsonic Kansei announced that it would be merged with components manufacturer Magneti Marelli from Fiat Chrysler Automobiles (FCA), acquired by the parent fund KKR for $7.1 billion (€6.2 billion). The news was mostly wrongly reported by the press as Calsonic Kansei purchasing Magneti Marelli, while the transaction happened between KKR and FCA. The company's previous bid of nearly $5.9 billion was deemed too low by FCA. By May 2019, Calsonic Kansei and Magneti Marelli united under one brand name, Marelli, as part of its strategy to compete on a global scale.

Business segments and products

Cockpit module and interior products
Instrument panels
Air conditioning units
Instrument clusters
Integrated switches

Climate control systems
HVAC units
Condensers
Compressors

Compressors
Variable displacement compressors
Rotary compressors

Heat exchange products
Radiators
Condensers
Motor fans
Internal air coolers
Oil coolers
Evaporators

Electronic products
Body Electronics
Body Control Modules
Auto Driving Position Systems
Airbag Control Units
Occupant Detection Systems
Keyless entry
Human Machine Interface components
Power electronics components

Exhaust systems
Exhaust manifold converters
Mufflers
Emission control devices

Sponsorship
Calsonic Kansei is primarily associated with Kazuyoshi Hoshino's Impul racing team in Japan, sponsoring them as Calsonic since 1982 as a title sponsor. By 2016, Calsonic Kansei is the longest-running title sponsor of a motor sports team in the world.

On March 9, 2016, Formula One racing team McLaren announced a multi-year partnership with Calsonic Kansei.

Calsonic is also the official radiator cooling supplier for Scuderia Toro Rosso since 2007.

See also

Nissan
Impul
Magneti Marelli

References

External links
Official site

Japanese companies established in 1938
2000 mergers and acquisitions
Auto parts suppliers of Japan
Companies based in Saitama Prefecture
Manufacturing companies established in 1938
Nissan